Thomas Freeman Gilbane (November 4, 1911 – November 7, 1981) was an American football player and coach. He played college football at Brown University in Providence, Rhode Island, where he earned honorable mention 1932 All-American honors as a center. Gilbane served as the head football coach at Westminster College in New Wilmington, Pennsylvania from 1934 to 1935, compiling a record of 5–11–1. Gilbane was later the chief executive officer of Gilbane Building Co., one of the largest construction companies in the United States. He died on November 7, 1981, at Rhode Island Hospital in Providence, Rhode Island.

Head coaching record

References

External links
 

1911 births
1981 deaths
American construction businesspeople
American football centers
Brown Bears football players
Westminster Titans football coaches